The Six Arts formed the basis of education in ancient Chinese culture. These were made and practiced by the Confucians.

History
During the Zhou dynasty (1122–256 BCE), students were required to master the "liù yì" (六藝) (Six Arts):

 Rites (禮)
 Music (樂)
 Archery (射)
 Chariotry or Equestrianism (御)
 Calligraphy (書)
 Mathematics (數)
Men who excelled in these six arts were thought to have reached the state of perfection, becoming a perfect gentleman.

The Six Arts were practiced by scholars and existed before Confucius, but became a part of Confucian philosophy. As such, Xu Gan (170–217 CE) discusses them in the Balanced Discourses.

The Six Arts were practiced by the 72 disciples of Confucius.

The Six Arts concept developed during the pre-imperial period. It incorporated both military and civil components. The civil side was later associated with the Four Arts (qin playing, chess, calligraphy and painting). However, the latter was more of a leisure characteristic for the late imperial time. It evidently overlaps with the Six Arts, since the qin epitomized music, chess (Go, a board-game known by its Japanese name) related to military strategy, while calligraphy dealt with the aesthetics of writing and character cultivation (the rites).

Influence 
The requirement of students to master the Six Arts parallels the Western concept of the Renaissance man. The emphasis on the Six Arts bred Confucian gentlemen who knew more than just canonical scholarship. The classical interest practical scholarship invigorated Chinese mathematics, astronomy, and science (e.g. Liu Hui, Zu Chongzhi, Shen Kuo, Yang Hui, Zhu Shijie). This tradition receded after the Yuan dynasty (1271–1368), when neo-Confucianism underscored the importance of the Analects over the other arts and technical fields.

At the Guozijian, the Imperial University, law, math, calligraphy, equestrianism, and archery were emphasized by the Ming Hongwu Emperor in addition to the Confucian classics, and was also required for the Imperial Examinations. Archery and equestrianism were added to the exam by Hongwu in 1370 and archery and equestrianism were required for non-military officials at the 武舉 College of War in 1162 by Song Emperor Xiaozong. The area around the Meridian Gate of Nanjing was used for archery by guards and generals under Hongwu.
 
By the Qing dynasty, Chinese specialists were not able to manage the lunar calendar accurately, and the calendar went out of phase with nature. This was a great embarrassment to the Chinese court, as the adherence to the lunar calendars by the vassal states was a recognition of the sovereignty of the Chinese court. Western astronomical expertise (see Jesuit China missions) was welcomed as an aftermath of Chinese interest in astronomy and mathematics, partially formulated in the classical Six Arts agenda.

See also 
 Chinese culture
 Confucian art
 Four arts
 Five Classics
 Seven liberal arts
 Taoism

References

Chinese culture
Zhou dynasty
Confucian culture